Mūla ("root") (Devanagari मूल/मूळ)  is the 19th nakshatra or "lunar mansion" in Jyotisha and corresponds to the stars: λ Sco, υ Sco, ε Sco, μ1 Sco, θ Sco, κ Sco, ι1 Sco, and ζ1 Sco. The symbol of Mula is a bunch of roots tied together (reticulated roots) or an 'elephant goad' (ankusha) and the Deity associated with it is Niriti, the god of dissolution and destruction. The Lord of Mula is Ketu (south lunar as a node).

The Ascendant/Lagna in Mula indicates a person who has a passionate desire to get to the truth and is good at investigation and research. They are direct, ardent and truthful and are shrewd and ambitious, but they can feel trapped and bound by circumstances and so feel resentment and a sense of betrayal. They can also suffer extreme reversals of fortune that may involve pain and cruelty. This nakshatra indicates some "adverse events" in respect of parents, especially father. E.g. Sant Jnaneshwar.

The centre of this galaxy, the Milky Way, lies in this nakshatra, hence the name Mula.

Under the traditional Hindu principle of naming individuals according to their Ascendant/Lagna, the following Sanskrit syllables correspond with this Nakshatra, and would belong at the beginning of a first name: Ye, Yo, Bha or Bhi.

References

Nakshatra